Nimos is an uninhabited Greek island in the Dodecanese island group of the southern Aegean Sea. It is the island Ymos of the ancient Greeks.

The island, like Symi itself and the other surrounding islets, has been proclaimed an archaeological site by Greece's Central Archaeological Council.

Islands of Greece
Dodecanese
Landforms of Rhodes (regional unit)
Islands of the South Aegean
Uninhabited islands of Greece